Levanger is a university town and the administrative center of Levanger Municipality in Trøndelag county, Norway.  The town is located along the eastern shore of the Trondheimsfjorden, at the mouth of the river Levangselva.  The town is located about half-way between the towns of Steinkjer and Stjørdalshalsen.  Prior to 1962, the town of Levanger and its immediate vicinity was its own municipality. The town houses a campus of the Nord University.

History
The kjøpstad of Levanger was founded by Carl III, king of Sweden, on 18 May 1836, on the site where the village of Levanger already existed.  The village had expanded from the traditional winter fair, known as the marsimartnan (lit. the St. Marcus Market of Levanger), dating back to the 13th century. In October 1836, as the town's borders set, Commissioner Mons Lie proposed that "the town shall bear the name of Carlslevanger, so the name of this ancient soil can be united with that of the new town's glorious founder". Despite the suggestion getting refused, the town protocols spoke of Carlslevanger Stad instead of Kjøpstaden Levanger until 1838. In 1838, the formannskapsdistrikt law classified this town as a ladested or port town.

The inhabitants of Levanger were not prepared at becoming a town, and so it took a long time before the town was constituted.  In these early days the town was ruled by the Foged (Royal rural administrator).  At that time there were already established a trade organization, "Levangerpatrisiatet" from 1695, based on the market. But only citizens of Trondheim could be members, until Levanger became a town in its own right.  In 1839, the first guild of the town was established, and in the following years several new trades and craftsmen settled in the town.

In 1841, the first official elections were held, and Hans Nicolai Grønn was elected the first mayor of the town.  Two years later, the town got its first water pipe system, its first two primitive street lamps and a town hall.

The fire-security report of 1844 clearly confirmed the great risk of disastrous fire in the town's narrow lanes; all houses were wooden houses. Therefore, the mayor hired major Johannes Sejersted to make a general report and draw up a new regulation plan, showing Levanger as a more "continental" town. Unfortunately, in 1846 (only two years later), the town was nearly totally ruined by a great fire. Maj. Sejersted's regulation plan was used when the town was rebuilt.  Levanger has been damaged by two great fires since that time: in 1877 and 1897.  Each time, however, the town was rebuilt as a wooden town, and still today most houses are wooden houses.

In 1856, the town was separated from the rural areas surrounding it.  This left the town as a very small municipality with 1,017 residents and the surrounding areas (population: 2,290) became the municipality of Levanger landsogn.

Throughout the 19th century, the famous market's economical importance faded out, and the ancient arrangement was reduced to a tradition without much content. That was the end of Levanger as an important port of foreign trade between Sweden and Norway. However, in the early 20th century, the town of Levanger was pleased by new establishments such as a county hospital and college of education.  The German occupation in 1940 was the beginning of a 40-year-long "interregnum" of the traditional "Marsimartnan".

During the 1960s, there were many municipal mergers across Norway due to the work of the Schei Committee.  In 1961, the town of Levanger decided to merge with several neighboring municipalities.  On 1 January 1962, the municipalities of Frol (population: 3,774), Skogn (population: 4,756), and Åsen (population: 1,939) were merged with the town of Levanger (population: 1,669) to become a new municipality called Levanger.  Upon the merger, however, Levanger lost its "town status".  The neighboring municipality of Ytterøy was merged with Levanger two years later.

In 1989, the "Marsimartnan" fair was brought back.  As a result of this and some changes to Norwegian law, the municipal council voted in 1997 to re-establish the town status of what used to be the town of Levanger.  The town is now the administrative centre of the municipality of Levanger.

The town is laid out according to an urban and regulated plot with proper streets such as Kirkegata, the main road in the town. It's more than just a townhall and a city square. In fact, Levanger's always been a town, though not always officially, and every inhabitant in the town area carry this piece of knowledge with pride. Thus there does exist a sense of distinction between town people, and the people from the surrounding countryside.

In 2002, Levanger joined the Cittaslow movement, although there have been some violations of the Cittaslow charter, of which can be mentioned the construction of the unharmonic new mini mall in Sjøgata, down by the seaside. This mini mall includes the post office, a grocery store, and an electrical appliances store.

Subsequent to a merger of several institutions of higher education, including the former Høgskolen i Nord-Trøndelag, Levanger houses a campus of the Nord University as of 2016.

Name
The town is named after the old Levanger farm, since the first Levanger Church was built there.  The first element is "Lif" old Norse for "lun" (sheltered) and the last element is angr which means "fjord".

Coat of arms
The coat of arms was granted on 25 November 1960 as the arms of the town of Levanger.  The arms show a gold-colored horse on a red background.  The horse is a symbol for the town as a major trading center between Sweden and Norway for many centuries. The arms did not change after the addition of the other municipalities (they had no arms when they were merged with Levanger).

Media gallery

See also
List of former municipalities of Norway

References

Populated places in Trøndelag
Former municipalities of Norway
Cities and towns in Norway
Cittaslow
Levanger
1836 establishments in Norway
1962 disestablishments in Norway
1997 establishments in Norway